Bernard Faÿ (3 April 1893 – 31 December 1978) was a French historian of Franco-American relations, an anti-Masonic polemicist who believed in a worldwide Jewish-Freemason conspiracy (see: Judeo-Masonic conspiracy theory) and during World War II a Vichy official.

Faÿ had first-hand knowledge of the United States and had studied at Harvard. He translated into French an excerpt of Gertrude Stein's The Making of Americans and wrote his view of the United States as it was at the beginning of Franklin D. Roosevelt's administration. He also published studies of Benjamin Franklin and George Washington.

Faÿ was a friend of Stein, Alice B. Toklas and the American composer Virgil Thomson, who owed to Faÿ his access to French intellectual circles since Faÿ knew most of the people in musical and literary Paris. He was active in compiling files on and attacking and imprisoning Freemasons during the Vichy regime from 1940 to 1944. He was convicted and sentenced to life in prison. He escaped after five years and resumed teaching history in Switzerland, at Fribourg, Ouchy and Lutry, where he taught European History, American History and Cultural History.

Life
Fay was born in Paris. At the beginning of the World War II, he was a professor at the Collège de France. During the French Occupation, he replaced Julien Cain as general administrator of the Bibliothèque Nationale and director of the anti-Masonic service of the Vichy Government. During his tenure of his office, his secretary, Gueydan de Roussel, was in charge of preparing the card indexes, containing 60,000 names drawn from archives seized from Freemason and other secret societies (Marshal Philippe Pétain was convinced that the indexes were at the heart of all France's troubles). Lists of names of Freemasons were released to the official gazette of the Vichy government for publication, and many Catholic papers copied these lists to induce public opprobrium. Faÿ edited and published during the four years of the Occupation the monthly review  Les Documents maçonniques ("Masonic Documents"), which published historical studies of Freemasonry, essays on the role of Freemasonry in society and frank anti-Masonic propaganda.

During Faÿ's tenure with the Vichy regime, 989 Freemasons were sent to concentration camps, where 549 were shot. In addition, about 3,000 lost their jobs. All Freemasons were required by law to declare themselves to authorities. In 1943 Faÿ produced the film Forces Occultes, directed by Jean Mamy, which depicts a worldwide Jewish-Freemason conspiracy.

Despite his anti-Semitism, Faÿ, who was suspected to be a Gestapo agent for much of the occupation, protected Gertrude Stein and Alice B. Toklas. Following the liberation, Stein wrote a letter on Faÿ's behalf when he was tried as a collaborator. In 1946 a French court condemned him to dégradation nationale and forced labor for life, but he managed to escape to Switzerland in 1951, funding to facilitate his prison breakout coming from Alice B. Toklas. Faÿ was pardoned by French President René Coty in 1959.

Appointed to an instructorship at the Institut de la Langue française in Fribourg, Switzerland, he was later forced to resign in the face of student protests. He taught French literature to American junior-year-abroad students in the 1960s at the Villa des Fougères in Fribourg, run by the Dominican sisters of Rosary College (now Dominican University) in River Forest, Illinois.

During the 1960s, he also taught at a girls' high school, Le Grand Verger, in Lutry, Switzerland, a short distance east of Lausanne on the northern border of Lake Geneva (Lac Leman). There he instructed American and other national girls in American history. His method consisted of notecard lectures and knowledge he carried in his head. He particularly shone in his art history class in which he taught from illustrated postcards of paintings, drawings and sculptures, as well as anecdotes derived from personal association with many expatriate artists in Paris from the preceding decades. In the European educational tradition, he demanded precise and voluminous feedback of his lecture material in tests. (ref on Le Grand Verger entry by former student, Janine Dawn Lieberman, 1962.)

In 1969, Faÿ is credited with being one of those who convinced Archbishop Marcel Lefebvre, the retired Superior General of the Holy Ghost Fathers, to start a new seminary in Fribourg for traditional Catholics disquieted by the changes wrought by the Second Vatican Council in the formation of priests.

Works

History and literary history 
 1925 : Bibliographie critique des ouvrages français relatifs aux États-Unis (1770–1800)
 1925 : L'esprit révolutionnaire en France et aux États-Unis à la fin du XVIIIe siècle
 1925 : Panorama de la littérature contemporaine
 1926 : L'Empire américain et sa démocratie en 1926
 1927 : Faites vos jeux
 1928 : Vue cavalière de la littérature américaine contemporaine
 1929 : Benjamin Franklin, bourgeois d'Amérique
 1930 : Le Comte Arthur de Gobineau et la Grèce
 1930 : Essai sur la poésie
 1932 : George Washington, gentilhomme
 1932 : La Gloire du Comte Arthur de Gobineau
 1935 : La Franc-maçonnerie et la révolution intellectuelle du XVIIIe siècle
 1937 : Les forces de l'Espagne : voyage à Salamanque
 1939 : Civilisation américaine
 1939 : L'Homme, mesure de l'histoire. La recherche du temps
 1943 : L'Agonie de l'Empereur (récit historique)
 1952 : De la prison de ce monde, journal, prières et pensées (1944–1952)
 1959 : La grande révolution
 1961 : L'École de l'imprécation ou Les Prophètes catholiques du dernier siècle (1850–1950)
 1961 : Louis XVI ou la fin d'un monde
 1962 : L'aventure coloniale
 1965 : Naissance d'un monstre, l'opinion publique
 1966 : Les Précieux
 1969 : La Guerre des trois fous, Hitler, Staline, Roosevelt
 1970 : L'Église de Judas?
 1970 : Beaumarchais ou les Fredaines de Figaro
 1974 : Jean-Jacques Rousseau ou le Rêve de la vie
 1978 : Rivarol et la Révolution
Prefaces
 Le duc de Montmorency-Luxembourg, premier baron chrétien de France, fondateur du Grand Orient : sa vie et ses archives de Paul Filleul

Pseudonyms 
Bernard Faÿ used the pen name Elphège du Croquet de l'Esq for the work:
 "Pensées, maximes et apophtègmes choisis des moralistes français et étrangers à l'usage de la jeunesse studieuse" (1954) for Du conquistador in 1957, with a preface by Bernard Faÿ.

Translations 
 1933 : Co-translation and preface for the French edition of Gertrude Stein's The Making of Americans: Being a History of a Family's Progress
 1934 : Translation for the French edition of Gertrude Stein's The Autobiography of Alice B. Toklas

Works in English
 Franklin, the Apostle of Modern Times, Little, Brown, and Company, 1929.
 The American Experiment, Harcourt, Brace and company, 1929.
 George Washington: Republican Aristocrat, Houghton Mifflin Company, 1931.
 Roosevelt and His America, Little, Brown & Company, 1933.
 The Two Franklins: Fathers of American Democracy, Little, Brown, and company, 1933.
Louis XVI; or, The End of a World, translated by Patrick O'Brien, Henry Regnery Company, 1967.

Articles
 "France and American Opinion," The Living Age, 22 July 1922.
 "The Intellectual Tastes of the American Public," The Living Age, 27 January 1923.
 "The Modern Writers of French Prose," The Living Age, 31 January 1925.
 "Tendencies and Groups in France," The Saturday Review, 31 January 1925.
 "French Literature and the Peasant," The Living Age, 1 December 1926.
 "Julian Green, Francophile," The Saturday Review, 18 June 1927.
 "France Dissected,"] The Forum, July 1927.
 "Take Your Choice," The Forum, October 1927.
 "His Excellency Mr. Franklin," The Forum, March 1928.
 "Protestant America," The Living Age, August 1928.
 "Catholic America," The Living Age, September 1928.
 "A Lucky Man," The Saturday Review, 19 October 1929.
 "Revolution as an Art," The Saturday Review, 22 March 1930.
 "Can America Rescue England?," The Living Age, 15 May 1930.
 "The French Nation," The Saturday Review, 14 June 1930.
 "In Our Stars," The Forum, January 1933.
 "A Rose Is a Rose", The Saturday Review, 2 September 1933.
 "A Scotchman's View of Our Democracy," The Saturday Review, 7 October 1933.
 "French Freaks for English Readers," The Saturday Review, 7 December 1935.
 "The Rise and Fall of Symbolism," The Saturday Review, 11 January 1936.

Notes

Further reading
 Banks, Eric. "Wars They Have Seen," The Chronicle of Higher Education, 23 October 2011.
 Harvey, John L. "Conservative Crossings: Bernard Faÿ and the Rise of American Studies in Third-Republic France," Historical Reflections, (2010) 36#1 pp. 95–124
 Compagnon, Antoine. Le Cas Bernard Faÿ, Gallimard, 2009.
 Sterling, Michael. "Gertrude Stein and Bernard Faÿ," Habitus, 11 January 2011.
 Will, Barbara. Unlikely Collaboration: Gertrude Stein, Bernard Faÿ, and the Vichy Dilemma, Columbia University Press, 2011.

External links
 Masonicinfo.com:Bernard Fay, a negative view.

1893 births
1978 deaths
Writers from Paris
Anti-Masonry
French collaborators with Nazi Germany
Harvard University alumni
French male non-fiction writers
20th-century French historians
Vichy France
French conspiracy theorists
French traditionalist Catholics
Traditionalist Catholic conspiracy theorists
20th-century French male writers